Baren is a Norwegian television series. The show was broadcast in 2000 and 2001 over two series on the Norwegian channel TV3.

Season 1
Start date: 29 September 2000
End date: 8 December 2000
Duration: 71 days
Prize: 250,000 Krone
Contestants:
The finalists: Jamila (winner) and Tobias (runner-up)
Evicted contestants: Adina, Chris, Christoffer, Elena, Henrik, Liv Maren, Sandra, Steinar and Vegard

Contestants

Season 2
Start date: 29 January 2001
End date: 27 April 2001
Duration: 89 days
Prize: 750,000 Krone
Contestants:
The finalists: Bjørn (winner) and Dan (runner-up)
Evicted contestants: Cathrin, Charlotte, Eyvinn, Frode, Frøydis, Henriette, Hilde C, June, Merita, Per-Erik, Stian, Tom-Erik and Tone-Marie
Other contestants (exit type unknown): Alf, Helge, Hilde R, Kristin and Linda

Contestants

Nominations

2000s Norwegian television series
2000 Norwegian television series debuts
2001 Norwegian television series endings
Norwegian reality television series
TV3 (Norway) original programming